Charles Hepburn-Stuart-Forbes-Trefusis may refer to:
 Charles Hepburn-Stuart-Forbes-Trefusis, 20th Baron Clinton (1834–1904), British politician
 Charles Hepburn-Stuart-Forbes-Trefusis, 21st Baron Clinton (1863–1957), British peer